Will It Blend? is a viral marketing campaign consisting of a series of infomercials demonstrating the Blendtec line of blenders, particularly the Total Blender. In the show, Blendtec founder Tom Dickson attempts to blend various unusual items in order to show off the power of his blender. Dickson started this marketing campaign after doing a blending experiment with a box of matches.

Structure
One of the most famous, Will it Blend? creations is the "cochicken", which is half of a chicken (cooked, usually rotisserie) blended with 12 fluid ounces of Coca-Cola. Although the show's example was blended with the bones (and thus was disclaimed as unsafe to eat), a boneless version was made on NBC's Today and served to Meredith Vieira.

In an episode released on April 3, 2007, Dickson placed a camcorder in the blender, giving viewers a first-person look inside the container while it was blended. Shortly afterwards, the production team, Kels Goodman and Ray Hansen, attempted to return what was left of the camcorder to Best Buy, with no success.

On the July 10, 2007, episode, an iPhone played the video intro before being blended. The resulting remains of the iPhone (which consisted of powder and a mangled metal frame), along with a brand-new Blendtec blender and a DVD compilation of the commercials, were put up for auction on eBay and sold for US$901 which was donated to charity. This was repeated with an iPhone 3G on the July 11, 2008, episode, with the eBay auction including a "Will It Blend" t-shirt, an autographed jar holding the blended remains of the phone, the box the iPhone came in, the earphones, and a brand-new Blendtec Total Blender. On the April 5, 2010, episode, an iPad was blended after being smashed to fit into the blender. The number of views this video received prompted Dickson to set up a contest on blendtec.com to give away either the shredded or the boxed iPad. Each prize came with a free Blendtec Total Blender. On the June 25, 2010, episode, an iPhone 4 was blended.

Some episodes are produced to coincide with certain events. For example, three episodes aired during the weekend of Super Bowl XLI. Because of trademark restrictions, the words "Super Bowl" were substituted with other words such as "Super Sunday," "The Big Game" or "That Last Football Game." The first episode had Dickson blend a smoothie out of salsa, tortilla chips, Buffalo wings, and some Budweiser. The second and third episodes used two blenders to predict the outcome of the Super Bowl by blending miniature helmets (AFC vs. NFC), and foam footballs (Indianapolis Colts vs. Chicago Bears). To coincide with the release of the film Transformers, Dickson blended toys of the Transformers characters Bumblebee and Swindle before challenging two of his grandchildren to transform the remains. When Dickson learned that The Beach Boys did not win Esquire Magazine'''s 2007 Esky Award, he blended the trophy.

Impact
Dickson has revealed that the campaign has been a great success for Blendtec:

The campaign took off almost instantly. We have definitely felt an impact in sales. Will it Blend has had an amazing impact to our commercial and our retail products.

Blendtec now sells Will It Blend? merchandise, including a spoof shirt with the slogan "Tom Dickson is my Homeboy".

Dickson has made many national television appearances, including NBC's The Tonight Show with Jay Leno on March 30, 2007, on which he blended a rake handle in mere seconds. Dickson also made his appearance in the History Channel series Modern Marvels. In the episode World's Strongest III aired March 6, 2008, the show ends with a special Will it Blend to prove if he can blend the channel's longest running series (in the form of a portable MP3 player).

In April 2007, radio station KDRF (eD-FM) in Albuquerque, New Mexico enlisted Tom Dickson to do a Will It Blend? version to promote the radio station. The three 30-second commercials show different styles of music CDs being blended, intending to showcase the station's variety format.

In September 2007, the videos earned the second-highest annual payout of about US$15,000 from the video hosting service Revver.

In 2008, Will It Blend? was featured on a Dreyer's/Edy's Dibs commercial. In the commercial, a girl holding a large lollipop tries some Dibs and wonders what will happen to lollipops when kids stop buying them in favor of the bite-sized ice-cream treats. The next scene shows giant lollipops being used as an alternative to waxing a man's hairy back, before Dickson blends them. A second version of the commercial has Dickson himself being waxed.Will It Blend? was nominated for the 2007 YouTube award for Best Series, winner of .Net Magazine's 2007 Viral Video campaign of the year, and winner of the Bronze level Clio Award for Viral Video in 2008.

The iPhone episode of Will It Blend? won Ad of the Week in episode 8 of the Australian show The Gruen Transfer''.

As of November 2022, the Blendtec YouTube channel has more than 293 million views.

See also
Blendtec
Hydraulic Press Channel
Will It Float?
Will It Break?
How Much is Inside?
YouTube

References

External links
Will It Blend? channel on YouTube

2006 web series debuts
2020 web series endings
Internet memes introduced in 2006
Internet properties established in 2006
Internet properties disestablished in 2020
Viral marketing
YouTube original programming